1992 Olympics may refer to:

1992 Summer Olympics, which were held in Barcelona, Spain
1992 Winter Olympics, which were held in Albertville, France